Sages & Specialists is an accessory for the 2nd edition of the Advanced Dungeons & Dragons fantasy role-playing game, published in 1996.

Contents
Sages & Specialists is a reference book for Dungeon Masters detailing 11 types of non-player character classes commonly found in a typical city.

Publication history
Sages & Specialists was published by TSR, Inc. in 1996.

Reception
Paul Pettengale reviewed Sages & Specialists for Arcane magazine, rating it a 6 out of 10 overall. Pettengale concludes: "While the idea behind Sages and Specialists is a sound one, and it's now useful to know exactly what tricks these character types can get up to (and at what skill level), it strikes me that the ref is rarely going to use this information - most of it is common sense, besides which, the precise abilities of a sage of three years' experience should be flexible; a whole scenario shouldn't be wrecked because a sage can't be privy to certain information at his current level. So, fine in theory, but in practice I have a few doubts about the usefulness of this addition to the AD&D rules set."

References

Dungeons & Dragons sourcebooks
Role-playing game supplements introduced in 1996